Fremont Township is a township in Page County, Iowa, USA.

References

Page County, Iowa
Townships in Iowa